Divine Invitation may refer to:

 Divine Invitation (Something Like Silas album), 2004
 Divine Invitation (Altaria album), 2007